The Spain national team, Spain team or Team Spain may refer to:

Acceleration Team Spain
Spain national American football team
Spain national badminton team
Spain national baseball team
Spain men's national basketball team
Spain women's national basketball team
Spain national beach handball team
Spain national beach soccer team
Spain women's national beach soccer team
Spain national cricket team
Spain Davis Cup team
Spain men's national field hockey team
Spain national football team
Spain women's national football team
Spain national futsal team
Spain men's national handball team
Spain men's national ice hockey team
Spain men's national lacrosse team
Spain national quidditch team
Spain national roller hockey team
Spain national rugby league team
Spain national rugby union team
Spain men's national squash team
Spain men's national volleyball team
Spain men's national water polo team
Spain women's national water polo team
Team Spain (roller derby)